The 2017–18 Ahmad Shah Abdali 4-day Tournament was an edition of the Ahmad Shah Abdali 4-day Tournament, a cricket tournament in Afghanistan. It was the first edition of the competition to be played with first-class status. The tournament started on 20 October 2017 and finished on 23 December 2017. Five regional teams competed in a double round-robin tournament with the top two teams in the group progressing to the final.

Speen Ghar Region finished first in the group stage and faced Band-e-Amir Region in the final. Band-e-Amir Region won the tournament, beating Speen Ghar Region by 537 runs in the final.

Squads

Points table

 Team qualified for the Final

Fixtures

Round 1

Round 2

Round 3

Round 4

Round 5

Round 6

Round 7

Round 8

Round 9

Round 10

Final

References

External links
 Series home at ESPN Cricinfo

Afghan domestic cricket competitions
Ahmad Shah Abdali 4-day Tournament
Ahmad Shah Abdali 4-day Tournament
Ahmad Shah Abdali 4-day Tournament
Ahmad Shah Abdali 4-day Tournament